Mohammad Nejad Mehdi is an Iranian football centre-back who currently plays for Iranian football club Foolad  in the Persian Gulf Pro League.

Club career

Nassaji
Nejad Mehdi started his career with Nassaji from youth levels. As Summer 2012 he promoted to first team. He spent 2 seasons with Nassaji and scored 4 times in 33 matches.

Padideh
He joined Padideh in summer 2014 with two-years contract. He made his debut for Padideh against Naft Masjed Soleyman as a starter in 2014–15 Iran Pro League. He played as a right back at Padideh while he was usually used as a center back by Nassaji.

Zob Ahan
On 27 June 2015 he joined Zob Ahan with a three seasons contract which keep him until end of 2017–18 season with Isfahani side.

Club career statistics

Honours
Zob Ahan
Hazfi Cup (1): 2015–16
Iranian Super Cup (1): 2016

References

External links
 Mohammad Nejad Mehdi at PersianLeague.com
 Mohammad Nejad Mehdi at IranLeague.ir

Living people
Iranian footballers
Zob Ahan Esfahan F.C. players
Nassaji Mazandaran players
Shahr Khodro F.C. players
1992 births
People from Babol
Association football defenders
Sportspeople from Mazandaran province